The men's 30 km free mass start competition of the 2015 Winter Universiade was held at the Sporting Centre FIS Štrbské Pleso on February 1.

Results

References 

Men's 30km